Wide Eyed may refer to:

 Wide Eyed (The Junior Varsity album), 2005
 Wide Eyed (Nichole Nordeman album), 1998

See also 
 Wide-Eye, a British animated children's TV series